The 1994 Croydon Council election took place on 5 May 1994 to elect members of Croydon London Borough Council in London, England. The whole council was up for election and the Labour party gained overall control of the council.

Jason Perry, who was elected as the first Mayor of Croydon in 2022, was elected to the council for the first time at this election in Coulsdon East.

Background

Election result

Ward results

Addiscombe

Ashburton

Bensham Manor

Beulah

Broad Green

Coulsdon East

Croham

Fairfield

Fieldway

Heathfield

Kenley

Monks Orchard

New Addington

Norbury

Purley

Rylands

Sanderstead

Selsdon

South Norwood

Spring Park

Thornton Heath

Upper Norwood

Waddon

West Thornton

Whitehorse Manor

Woodcote & Coulsdon West

Woodside

References

1994
1994 London Borough council elections